Haelogo Airport , also known as Suria Airport, is an airfield serving Haelogo, in the Central Province of Papua New Guinea.

References

External links
 

Airports in Papua New Guinea
Central Province (Papua New Guinea)